Mount Rhamnus is a mountain in Antarctica. It is 865 meters tall and lies 2 nautical miles (3.7 km) northeast of Mount Nemesis on the north side of Neny Fjord, Graham Land. Seen from the west, it appears as a mainly snow-covered pyramid. First surveyed in 1936 by the British Graham Land Expedition (BGLE) under Rymill. Resurveyed in 1947 by the Falkland Islands Dependencies Survey (FIDS) who named the mountain for its association with Mount Nemesis. According to the mythological story, the Greek goddess Nemesis had a celebrated sanctuary at Rhamnus in Attica.

References

 

Mountains of Graham Land
Fallières Coast